Bibi Zhou (simplified Chinese: 周笔畅; traditional Chinese: 周筆暢; pinyin: Zhōu Bǐchàng), also known as Bibi Zhou or Bibi Chow, is a Chinese singer and songwriter. She has won hundreds of awards and accolades from music, fashion, entertainment, image, film, philanthropy.

2012 The China Pride·Love China Ceremony 
2012 The China Pride·Love China Ceremony(Chinese:2012中国娇子·中国爱盛典)is a TV special ceremony, held by Sichuan Provincial Television station SCTV, to honour people in charity, especially during 2008 Wenchuan earthquake.

!
|-
|2012
|Bibi Zhou
|Loving Heart Public Figure(Chinese: 爱心公益人物)
|
|

9+2 Music Pioneer Awards 
9+2 Music Pioneer Awards, is a music awards show founded by Guangdong radio to honor Guangdong and Hong Kong Cantonese artist.9+2 is referring to the Pan-pearl river delta region.

!
|-
!scope="row" rowspan="3"|2006
|Notes(Chinese:笔记)
|Top 10 Pioneer Songs of the Year(Mainland China)(Chinese:内地十大先锋金曲)
|
|rowspan="3" style="text-align:center;"|
|-
|Bibi Zhou
|Most Popular Pioneer: Female(Mainland China)(Chinese:内地最受欢迎先锋歌手-女歌手)
|
|-
|Who Touched My Violin String(Chinese:谁动了我的琴弦)
|11 Radio Stations'Choice:Best Album(Chinese:11家电台联颁最佳专辑)
|
|-
!scope="row" rowspan="4"|2008
|Bibi Zhou
|Most Popular Pioneer: Female(Mainland China)(Chinese:内地最受欢迎先锋歌手-女歌手)
|
|rowspan="4" style="text-align:center;"|
|-
|Liuyang River 2008(Chinese:浏阳河2008)
|Top 10 Pioneer Songs of the Year(Mainland China)(Chinese:内地先十大锋金曲)
|
|-
|Bibi Zhou
|Most Popular Female Pioneer on Internet(Chinese:网上最具人气先锋歌手)
|
|-
|Now
|11 Radio Stations'Choice:Best Album(Chinese:11家电台联颁最佳专辑)
|
|-
!scope="row" rowspan="4"|2010
|Bibi Zhou
|Most Popular Pioneer: Female(Mainland China)(Chinese:内地最受欢迎先锋歌手-女歌手)
|
|rowspan="4" style="text-align:center;"|
|-
|Your Love(Chinese:你们的爱)
|Top 10 Pioneer Songs of the Year(Mainland China)(Chinese:内地十大先锋金曲)
|
|-
|Bibi Zhou
|Top 5 Music Pioneers:Female(Chinese:最受欢迎先锋歌手五强)
|
|-
|Kids(Chinese:娃娃)
|Best Premiere Song (Chinese:最佳首播歌曲)
|
|-
!scope="row" rowspan="2"|2013
|UNLOCK
|23 Radio Stations'Choice:Best Album(Chinese:23家电台联颁最佳专辑)
|
|rowspan="2" style="text-align:center;"|
|-
|Close Friend(Chinese:密友)
|Top 10 Pioneer Songs of the Year(Mainland China)(Chinese:内地十大先锋金曲)
|

Baidu Entertainment Boiling Point 

!
|-
!scope="row" rowspan="3"|2010
|Bibi Zhou
|Baidu Tieba Most Popular Charming Female Singer(Chinese:百度贴吧最具人气魅力女歌手)
|
|
|-
|Bibi Zhou
|Most Popular Idol(Chinese: 最人气偶像)
|
|
|-
|Bibi Zhou
|Best Fanbase(Chinese:最佳粉丝团)
|
|
|-
!scope="row" rowspan="2"|2011
|Bibi Zhou
|Most Popular Female Singer(Mainland China)(Chinese:最热门内地女歌手)
|
|
|-
|One-way Mirror(Chinese:单面镜)
|Most Popular Top 10 Hits(Chinese:最热门十大金曲)
|
|

Beijing Pop Music Awards 

!
|-
!scope="row" rowspan="2"|2012
|Bibi Zhou
|Media Recommdation Award(Chinese:传媒推荐歌手大奖)
|
|
|-
|Lipsyncing(Chinese:对嘴)
|Golden melodies of the Year(Chinese:年度金曲)
|
|

BQ Weekly Awards 
BQ Weekly Awards(Chinese:BQ红人榜)was created by a Beijing magazine BQ Weekly in 2006, honoring people in multiple fields.

!
|-
|2010
|Bibi Zhou
|Most Popular Singer(Chinese:年度人气歌手)
|
|
|-
|2011
|Bibi Zhou
|Best Singer of the Year(Chinese:年度最佳歌手)
|
|

China Fashion Awards 
China Fashion Awards(Chinese:星尚大典)is created by Enjoyoung Media Co., Ltd., owned by SMG(Shanghai Media Group Limited),to honour public figure in fashion event.

!
|-
|2012
|Bibi Zhou
|Outstanding Music Pioneer(Chinese:杰出音乐先锋人物)
|
|

China Gold Record Awards

!
|-
|2012
|Canned Fish(Chinese:鱼罐头)
|Music Video Award(Chinese:音乐录影带奖)
|
|

China Music Awards 
The China Music Awards (Chinese:全球华语音乐榜中榜颁奖典礼), also known as CMA, is a Chinese music awards show, established by Channel [V] in 1994.

!
|-
|2006
|Notes
|Most Popular Searched Song of the Year(Chinese:搜索最热门年度歌曲奖)
|
|
|-
|2007
|Bibi Zhou
|Best Newcomer of the Year(Chinese:最佳新人)
|
|
|-
|2008
|Bibi Zhou
|Most Popular Female Singer(Mainland)(Chinese:内地最受欢迎女歌手)
|
|rowspan="1" style="text-align:center;"|
|-
|2013
|Bibi Zhou
|Most Popular Female Singer(Mainland)(Chinese:内地最受欢迎女歌手)
|
|rowspan="1" style="text-align:center;"|
|-
!scope="row" rowspan="2"|2014
|Bibi Zhou
|Most Popular Female Singer(Mainland)(Chinese:内地最受欢迎女歌手)
|
|rowspan="2" style="text-align:center;"|
|-
|Unlock
|Annual Heated Album(Chinese:年度劲爆专辑)
|
|-
!scope="row" rowspan="2"|2015
|Bibi Zhou
|Best Female Singer(Mainland)(Chinese:内地最佳女歌手)
|
|rowspan="1" style="text-align:center;"|
|-
|Bibi Zhou
|Most Popular Female Singer(Mainland)(Chinese:内地最受欢迎女歌手)
|
|rowspan="1" style="text-align:center;"|
|-
!scope="row" rowspan="2"|2016
|BiBi Zhou
|Best Female Singer(Mainland)(Chinese:内地最佳女歌手)
|
|rowspan="2" style="text-align:center;"|
|-
|BOOM!Bibi Zhou 2015 Concert Tour(Chinese:BOOM!周笔畅2015巡回演唱会)
|Best Concert(Chinese:最佳演唱会)
|

China Original Song Awards 
China Original Song Awards(Chinese:中国原创歌曲奖), created by CNR(CHINA NATIONAL RADIO)in 2003.
!
|-
!scope="row" rowspan="2"|2009
!scope="row" rowspan="2"|Bibi Zhou
|Favorite Female Singer(Mainland China)(Chinese:内地最受欢迎女歌手)
|
|
|-
|Best Fashion Award(Chinese: 最佳风尚歌手)
|
|

Chinese Music Awards 
The Chinese Music Awards (Chinese: 华语金曲奖) is an accolade founded in 2008 to recognize outstanding achievement in the Chinese music industry.

!
|-
!scope="row" rowspan="4"|2010
!scope="row" rowspan="2"|Bibi Zhou
|My Favorite Female Singer(Mainland China)(Chinese:我最喜爱的女歌手(内地))
|
|
|-
|Most Popular Singer by National voting(Chinese:全国乐迷票选最具人气歌手 )
|
|
|-
|Your Love(Chinese:你们的爱)
|Top 10 Mandarin songs(Chinese:十大华语金曲)
|
|
|-
|One-way Mirror(Chinese:单面镜)
|Outstanding Mandarin Song(Chinese:优秀国语歌曲)
|
|
|-
!scope="row" rowspan="2"|2011
|i, fish, light, mirror(Chinese:i，鱼，光，镜)
|Top 10 Mandarin Albums(Chinese:国语十大唱片)
|
|
|-
|Bibi Zhou/i, fish, light, mirror(Chinese:i，鱼，光，镜)
|Best Mandarin Female Singer(Chinese:年度最佳国语女歌手)
|
|rowspan="1" style="text-align:center;"|
|-
!scope="row" rowspan="4"|2012
|Lipsyncing(Chinese:对嘴)
|Outstanding Mandarin Song(Chinese:优秀国语歌曲)
|
|
|-
|Black Apple(Chinese:黑·择·明)
|My Favorite Album(Chinese:我最喜爱的专辑)
|
|
|-
|Bibi Zhou
|My Favorite Female Singer(Mainland China)(Chinese:我最喜爱的女歌手（内地）)
|
|
|-
|Bibi Zhou
|Most Popular National Singer(Chinese:全国最受欢迎歌手)
|
|

Cosmopolitan Beauty Awards 

!
|-
|2014
|Bibi Zhou
|Forever Young Icon
|
|

ERS Chinese Top Ten Awards 
ERS Chinese Top Ten Awards(Chinese:东方风云榜颁奖典礼), is a music awards show, mostly known for honoring Mandopop music and Mandrin singers based on the radio chart. It is created by Shanghai Media Group Limited in 1993.

!
|-
!scope="row" rowspan="2"|2006
|Bibi Zhou
|Most Popular Singer(Chinese:风云人气奖)
|
|rowspan="2" style="text-align:center;"|
|-
|Notes(Chinese:笔记)
!scope="row" rowspan="2"|Top 10 Hits(Chinese:十大金曲)
|
|-
!scope="row" rowspan="2"|2007
|Phone Numbers(Chiese:号码)
|
|rowspan="2" style="text-align:center;"|
|-
|Bibi Zhou
|Outstanding Performance of the Year(Chinese:年度杰出表现奖)
|
|-
!scope="row" rowspan="2"|2008
|Bibi Zhou
|Best Female Singer(Chinese:最佳女歌手)
|
|rowspan="2" style="text-align:center;"|
|-
|Liuyang River 2008(Chinese:浏阳河2008)
|Top 10 Hits(Chinese:十大金曲)
|
|-
!scope="row" rowspan="2"|2012
|Black Apple(Chinese:黑·择·明)
|Best Album(Chinese:最佳专辑)
|
|rowspan="2" style="text-align:center;"|
|-
|Bibi Zhou
|Mainland Most Popular Singer(Chinese:华语5强-内地最受欢迎歌手)
|
|-
|2013
|Notes(Chinese:笔记)
|Best Songs in 20 years(Chinese:20年至尊金曲)
|
|rowspan="1" style="text-align:center;"|
|-
!scope="row" rowspan="2"|2014
|Bibi Zhou
|Best Female Singer(Chinese:最佳女歌手)
|
|rowspan="2" style="text-align:center;"|
|-
|Bibi Zhou
|Asia Popular Singer(Chinese:亚洲人气歌手)
|
|-
|2015
|Bibi Zhou
|Best Female Singer(Chinese:最佳女歌手)
|
|rowspan="1" style="text-align:center;"|
|-
!scope="row" rowspan="2"|2016
|BiBi Zhou
|Best Female Singer(Chinese:最佳女歌手)
|
|rowspan="2" style="text-align:center;"|
|-
|Best Album(Chinese:周笔畅)
|Eye rolling(Chinese:翻白眼)
|

Fashion Power 

!
|-
|2016
|Bibi Zhou
|Best Attitude Musician(Chinese:年度最具态度音乐人)
|
|

Global Chinese Music Awards 

!
|-
!scope="row" rowspan="3"|2006
|Bibi Zhou
|Most Popular New Female Act(Chinese:最受欢迎女新人)
|
|rowspan="3" style="text-align:center;"|
|-
|Bibi Zhou
|Allround Act(Chinese:全能艺人奖)
|
|-
|Bibi Zhou
|Regional Outstanding Singer for Guangdong(Chinese:广东地区杰出歌手)
|
|-
!scope="row" rowspan="4"|2007
|Bibi Zhou
|Top 5 Most Popular Female Singers(Chinese: 最受欢迎女歌手5强)
|
|rowspan="4" style="text-align:center;"|
|-
|Bibi Zhou
|Allround Artist(Chinese:全能艺人奖)
|
|-
|Bibi Zhou
|Regional Outstanding Singer for Guangdong(Chinese:广东地区杰出歌手)
|
|-
|The Future is Now(Chinese:未来就是现在)
|Favorite 20 Hits(Chinese:二十大最受欢迎金曲)
|
|-
|2008
|Bibi Zhou
|Top 5 Most Popular Female Singers(Chinese: 最受欢迎女歌手5强)
|
|rowspan="1" style="text-align:center;"|
|-
!scope="row" rowspan="3"|2009
|Bibi Zhou
|Regional Outstanding Singer for Guangdong(Chinese:广东地区杰出歌手)
|
|rowspan="3" style="text-align:center;"|
|-
|Bibi Zhou
|7 Radio Stations Media Recommdation Award(Chinese:七台联颁传媒推荐歌手奖)
|
|-
|Your Love(Chinese:你们的爱)
!scope="row" rowspan="2"|Favorite 20 Hits(Chinese:二十大最受欢迎金曲)
|
|-
|2010
|Canned Fish(Chinese:鱼罐头)
|
|rowspan="1" style="text-align:center;"|
|-
!scope="row" rowspan="4"|2013
|Unlock
|Best Album(Chinese:最佳专辑)
|
|rowspan="4" style="text-align:center;"|
|-
|Bibi Zhou
|Top 5 Most Popular Female Singers(Chinese: 最受欢迎女歌手5强)
|
|-
|Bibi Zhou
|Regional Outstanding Singer for Guangdong(Chinese:广东地区杰出歌手)
|
|-
|Ribs(Chinese:肋骨)
|Favorite 20 Hits(Chinese:二十大最受欢迎金曲)
|

Global Chinese Golden Chart Awards 

!
|-
|2011
|Bibi Zhou
|CityFM Recommendation Award(Chinese:CITYFM推崇大奖)
|
|

IFPI Hong Kong Top Sales Music Award 

!
|-
|2011
|i, fish, light, mirror(Chinese:i，鱼，光，镜)
|IFPI Top 10 Selling Mandrin Album(IFPI十大最高销量国语唱片)
|
|

Entertainment Awards 

!
|-
|2008
|Liuyang River 2008(Chinese:浏阳河2008)
|Hit of the Year(Chinese:年度金曲)
|
|
|-
!scope="row" rowspan="2"|2010
|Bibi Zhou
|Most Popular Entertainers of the Year(Chinese:最具人气娱乐人物)
|
|rowspan="2" style="text-align:center;"|
|-
|Your Love(Chinese:你们的爱)
|Hit of the Year(Chinese:年度至尊金曲)
|
|-
|2011
|i, fish, light, mirror(Chinese:i，鱼，光，镜)
|Most Influential Music Album(Chinese:年度最具影响力音乐专辑)
|
|rowspan="1" style="text-align:center;"|

Nickelodeon Kids' Choice Awards 

!
|-
|2015
|Bibi Zhou
|Favorite Chinese Act
|
|

Metro Radio Hits Music Awards 

!
|-
|2005
|Bibi Zhou
|National Popular Singer(Chinese:全国劲爆人气歌手大奖)
|
|
|-
!scope="row" rowspan="3"|2009
|Bibi Zhou
|Metro Best Singer(Online Voted)(Chinese:新城全国乐迷投选劲爆歌手)
|
|
|-
|Bibi Zhou
|Metro Best Mandarin Singer(Chinese:新城劲爆国语歌手)
|
|
|-
|Kids(Chinese:娃娃)
|Metro Best Song(Chinese:新城劲爆歌曲)
|
|
|-
!scope="row" rowspan="3"|2010
|Bibi Zhou
|Metro Best Singer(Online Voted)(Chinese:新城全国乐迷投选劲爆歌手)
|
|
|-
|Bibi Zhou
|Metro Best Mandarin Singer(Chinese:新城劲爆国语歌手)
|
|
|-
|Canned Fish(Chinese:鱼罐头)
|Metro Best Mandarin Song(Chinese:新城劲爆国语歌曲 )
|
|

Metro Radio Mandarin Hits Music Awards 

!
|-
!scope="row" rowspan="3"|2006
|Bibi Zhou
|Mandarin Force Female Singer(Chinese:新城国语力女歌手)
|
|
|-
|Bibi Zhou
|National Favorite Female Singer(Chinese:全国最受欢迎女歌手)
|
|
|-
|Notes(Chinese:笔记)
|Mandarin Force Most Popular Karaoke Songs(Chinese:新城国语力热爆K歌奖 )
|
|
|-
!scope="row" rowspan="3"|2009
|Bibi Zhou
|Mandarin Force Female Singer(Chinese:新城国语力女歌手)
|
|
|-
|Bibi Zhou
|National Most Popular Singer (Guangzhou)(Chinese:国语力全国最受欢迎歌手-广州)
|
|
|-
|Your Love(Chinese:你们的爱)
|Metro Radio Mandarin New Force Songs(Chinese:新城国语力新势力歌曲)
|
|
|-
!scope="row" rowspan="3"|2010
|Bibi Zhou
|Mandarin Force Female Singer(Chinese:新城国语力女歌手)
|
|
|-
|Bibi Zhou
|Mandarin Force National Most Popular Singer(Chinese:国语力全国最受欢迎歌手)
|
|
|-
|Canned Fish(Chinese:鱼罐头)
|Mandarin Force Best Mandarin Song(Chinese:新城国语力歌曲)
|
|
|-
|2011
|Bibi Zhou
|National Most Popular Stage Performance Award(Chinese:全国最受欢迎舞台大奖)
|
|
|-
!scope="row" rowspan="3"|2013
|Bibi Zhou
|National Favorite Singer(Chinese:全国最受欢迎歌手)
|
|
|-
|Unlock
|Mandarin Force Album(Chinese:新城国语力专辑 )
|
|
|-
|Running Away
|Mandarin Force Song(Chinese:新城国语力歌曲)
|
|
|-
!scope="row" rowspan="3"|2014
|Bibi Zhou
|Mandarin Force Singer of the Year(Chinese:新城国语力年度歌手)
|
|
|-
|Bibi Zhou
|National Favorite Singer(Chinese:全国最受欢迎歌手)
|
|
|-
|Don't Forget(Chinese:别忘了)
|Mandarin Force Song(Chinese:新城国语力歌曲)
|
|

MIGU Music Awards 
The MIGU Music Awards (Chinese: 无线音乐盛典咪咕汇) is a music awards show, founded by China Mobile, owned and running the MIGU and Shanghai Media Group Limited to recognise most popular music and artists based on the MIGU music store's statistics.

!
|-
!scope="row" rowspan="3"|2007
|Phone Numbers(Chinese:号码)
|Best Selling Original Song from a Movie or Television(Chinese:年度最畅销影视金曲 )
|
|
|-
|Bibi Zhou
|Special Contributions Award(Chinese:年度特别贡献奖)
|
|
|-
|Bibi Zhou
|Best Selling Female Artist of the Year (Mainland China)(Chinese:年度最畅销内地女歌手)
|
|
|-
!scope="row" rowspan="2"|2013
|Bibi Zhou
|Most Influential Female Singer(Chinese: 最具影响力女歌手)
|
|rowspan="2" style="text-align:center;"|
|-
|Ribs(Chinese:肋骨)
|Best Selling Personality Song(Chinese:最畅销个性张扬金曲)
|

MTV Europe Music Awards 

!
|-
!scope="row" rowspan="2"|2014
|Bibi Zhou
|Best Worldwide Act
|
|
|-
|Bibi Zhou
|Best Chinese & Hong Kong Act
|
|

Music King Awards 

!
|-
!scope="row" rowspan="2"|2009
|Bibi Zhou
|Mainland Most Popular Female Singer(Chinese: 内地最受欢迎女歌手)
|
|
|-
|Your Love(Chinese:你们的爱)
|Top 10 Hits:Mandarin(Chinese:十大金曲-国语)
|
|
|-
!scope="row" rowspan="3"|2011
|Bibi Zhou
|Mainland Most Popular Female Singer(Chinese: 内地最受欢迎女歌手)
|
|
|-
|Bibi Zhou
|Music King Media Award(Chinese:劲歌王传媒大奖)
|
|
|-
|Time Machine and Tramp(Chinese:时光机与流浪者)
|Top 10 Hits:Mandarin(Chinese:十大金曲-国语)
|
|

MusicRadio China Top Chart Awards 
MusicRadio China Top Chart Awards(Chinese:MusicRadio中国TOP排行榜颁奖典礼), is an annual Chinese Pop Music awards ceremony, created by CHINA NATIONAL RADIO in 2003.

!
|-
|2007
|Don't love me like a friend(Chinese:别爱我像爱个朋友)
|Annual Golden Melodies(Chinese:年度金曲)
|
|
|-
!scope="row" rowspan="4"|2008
|WOW
|Best Female Artist(Mainland China)(Chinese:内地最佳女歌手)
|
|rowspan="2" style="text-align:center;"|
|-
|WOW
|Annual Golden Melodies(Chinese:年度金曲)
|
|-
|Bibi Zhou
|Favorite Female Artist(Mainland China)(Chinese:内地最受欢迎女歌手)
|
|rowspan="1" style="text-align:center;"|
|-
|WOW
|Best Album of the Year(Mainland China)(Chinese:内地年度最佳唱片)
|
|rowspan="1" style="text-align:center;"|
|-
!scope="row" rowspan="3"|2010
|Bibi Zhou
|Favorite Female Artist(Mainland China)(Chinese:内地最受欢迎女歌手)
|
|rowspan="3" style="text-align:center;"|
|-
|Bibi Zhou
|Allround Artist(Mainland China)(Chinese:内地全能艺人)
|
|-
|Your Love(Chinese:你们的爱)
|Annual Golden Melodies(Chinese:年度金曲)
|
|-
!scope="row" rowspan="4"|2011
|i, fish, light, mirror(Chinese:i，鱼，光，镜)
|Best Album of the Year(Mainland China)(Chinese:内地年度最佳唱片)
|
|rowspan="3" style="text-align:center;"|
|-
|Bibi Zhou
|Favorite Female Artist(Mainland China)(Chinese:内地最受欢迎女歌手)
|
|-
|Canned Fish(Chinese:鱼罐头)
|Annual Golden Melodies(Chinese:年度金曲)
|
|-
|Bibi Zhou
|Best Female Artist(Mainland China)(Chinese:内地最佳女歌手)
|
|
|-
!scope="row" rowspan="3"|2012
|Bibi Zhou
|Favorite Female Artist(Mainland China)(Chinese:内地最受欢迎女歌手)
|
|rowspan="2" style="text-align:center;"|
|-
|Black Apple(Chinese:黑·择·明)
|Favorite Album(Mainland China)(Chinese:年度最受欢迎唱片-内地)
|
|-
|Black Apple(Chinese:黑苹果)
|Annual Golden Melodies(Chinese:年度金曲)
|
|rowspan="1" style="text-align:center;"|
|-
!scope="row" rowspan="2"|2014
|Running Away
|Annual Golden Melodies(Chinese:年度金曲)
|
|
|-
|Bibi Zhou
|Favorite Female Artist(Mainland China)(Chinese:内地最受欢迎女歌手)
|
|
|-
!scope="row" rowspan="2"|2016
|Bibi Zhou
|Mainland Best Female(Chinese:内地最佳女歌手)
|
|rowspan="2" style="text-align:center;"|
|-
|Eye rolling(Chinese:翻白眼)
|Mainland Best Album(Chinese:内地最佳专辑)
|

QQ Music Awards 

!
|-
!scope="row" rowspan="2"|2016
|Bibi Zhou
|Best Female Artist(Mainland China)(Chinese:年度内地最佳女歌手)
|
|
|-
|Eye-rolling(Chinese:翻白眼)
|Best Creative Album(Chinese:年度最佳创意专辑)
|
|

Singapore Hits Awards 

!
|-
|2009
|Bibi Zhou
|Overseas Outstanding Artist Award(Mainland China)(Chinese:海外杰出歌手奖(中国内地))
|
|

Sino.com Internet Awards 

!
|-
|2008
|Bibi Zhou
|Sino Music Most Popular Artist(Chinese:新浪乐库最具人气歌手)
|
|
|-
|2011
|i, fish, light, mirror(Chinese:i，鱼，光，镜)
|Album of the Year(Chinese: 年度专辑)
|
|

Sprite Music Chart Awards 

!
|-
!scope="row" rowspan="3"|2010
|This words(Chinese:这句话)
|Golden songs(Mainland China)(Chinese:内地金曲)
|
|
|-
|Bibi Zhou
|Favorite Female Singer(Mainland China)(Chinese:内地最受欢迎女歌手)
|
|
|-
|Bibi Zhou
|Favorite National Pop Idol(Chinese:全国我最喜爱人气偶像)
|
|
|-
!scope="row" rowspan="3"|2011
|i, fish, light, mirror(Chinese:i，鱼，光，镜)
|Best Album(Mainland)(Chinese:内地最优秀专辑)
|
|
|-
|One-way Mirror(Chinese:单面镜)
|Golden songs(Mainland China)(Chinese:内地金曲)
|
|
|-
|Bibi Zhou
|Best Female Singer(Mainland China)(Chinese:内地最佳女歌手)
|
|
|-
!scope="row" rowspan="3"|2012
|Bibi Zhou
|Favorite Female Singer(Mainland China)(Chinese:内地最受欢迎女歌手)
|
|rowspan="3" style="text-align:center;"|
|-
|Black Apple(Chinese:黑·择·明)
|Best Album(Mainland China)(Chinese:内地最优秀专辑)
|
|-
|Lipsyncing(Chinese:对嘴)
|Golden songs(Mainland China)(Chinese:内地金曲)
|

Star Awards 
Star Awards(Chinese:星光大典)is a ceremony held by Tencent co. to honour people in movie, television, music.

!
|-
|2008
|First Anniversary(Chinese:一周年)
|Top 10 Hits(Chinese:十大金曲)
|
|
|-
|2010
|This Words(Chinese:这句话)
|Top 10 Hits(Chinese:十大金曲)
|
|

Top Chinese Music Awards 
The Top Chinese Music Awards (Chinese:音乐风云榜年度盛典) is an awards ceremony held annually by Enlight Media since 2001,to honour people in Chinese music.

!
|-
|2006
|Bibi Zhou
|Favorite Female Artist(Mainland China)(Chinese:内地最受欢迎女歌手)
|
|rowspan="1" style="text-align:center;"|
|-
!scope="row" rowspan="3"|2007
|Bibi Zhou/Who Touched My Violin String(Chinese:谁动了我的琴弦)
|Best Female Artist(Mainland China)(Chinese:内地最佳女歌手)
|
|
|-
|Who Touched My Violin String(Chinese:谁动了我的琴弦)
|Best Album(Mainland China)(Chinese:最佳专辑(内地))
|
|
|-
|Bibi Zhou/Who Touched My Violin String(Chinese:谁动了我的琴弦)
|Best New Artist(Mainland China)(Chinese:最佳新人(内地))
|
|
|-
!scope="row" rowspan="2"|2010
|Bibi Zhou
|New Music Forces Female Singer(Chinese:音乐新势力女歌手)
|
|rowspan="2" style="text-align:center;"|
|-
|Your Love(Chinese:你们的爱)
|Top 10 Golden Melodies in 10 Years(Mainland China)(Chinese:十年内地十大金曲)
|
|-
!scope="row" rowspan="3"|2011
|Bibi Zhou/i, fish, light, mirror(Chinese:i，鱼，光，镜)
|Best Female Artist(Mainland China)(Chinese:内地最佳女歌手)
|
|rowspan="1" style="text-align:center;"|
|-
|i, fish, light, mirror(Chinese:i，鱼，光，镜)
|Album of the Year(Mainland China)(Chinese: 年度专辑)
|
|
|-
|I miss U missing me
|Best Song(Mainland China)(Chinese:最佳歌曲奖(内地))
|
|
|-
!scope="row" rowspan="4"|2012
|Black Apple(Chinese:黑·择·明)
|Best Album(Chinese:最佳专辑)
|
|rowspan="2" style="text-align:center;"|
|-
|Bibi Zhou
|Favorite Female Artist(Mainland China)(Chinese:内地最受欢迎女歌手)
|
|-
|I miss U missing me
|Best Song(Mainland China)(Chinese:最佳歌曲奖(内地))
|
|
|-
|Black Apple(Chinese:黑苹果)
|Best Music Video(Chinese:最佳音乐录影带)
|
|
|-
!scope="row" rowspan="4"|2014
|Bibi Zhou/Unlock
|Best Female Artist(Chinese:最佳女歌手)
|
|rowspan="2" style="text-align:center;"|
|-
|Bibi Zhou
|Favorite Female Artist(Mainland China)(Chinese:内地最受欢迎女歌手)
|
|-
|Unlock
|Best Album(Chinese:最佳专辑)
|
|
|-
|Bibi Zhou/Good Night Words(Chinese:晚安的话)
|Best lyrics(Chinese:最佳作词)
|
|
|-
!scope="row" rowspan="2"|2015
|Bibi Zhou
|Best Pop Female Artist(Chinese:最佳流行演唱女歌手)
|
|rowspan="2" style="text-align:center;"|
|-
|Bibi Zhou
|Fashion Style of the Year(Chinese:年度风尚歌手)
|
|-
!scope="row" rowspan="3"|2016
|Bibi Zhou/Eye-rolling
|Best Female Artist of the Year(Chinese:年度最佳女歌手)
|
|
|-
|Bibi Zhou
|Favorite Female Artist(Chinese:年度最受欢迎女歌手)
|
|
|-
|I choose to like you(Chinese:我选择喜欢你)
|Best Web series theme song(Chinese:年度最受欢迎网剧歌曲)
|
|

Top Chinese Music Chart Break-Through New Artist Awards 

!
|-
|2011
|Bibi Zhou
|Best Model for New Artist(Chinese:最佳榜样歌手)
|
|

TVB8 Mandarin Music On Demand Awards 

!
|-
!scope="row" rowspan="3"|2006
|Bibi Zhou
|Mainland Most Popular Female Singer(Chinese:内地观众最爱女歌手)
|
|
|-
|Only Me Left (Chinese:只剩我一个)
|Golden Melody Prize(Chinese:金曲奖)
|
|
|-
|Bibi Zhou
|Most Popular Female New Singer:Gold Prize(Chinese:最受欢迎女新人-金奖)
|
|
|-
!scope="row" rowspan="3"|2008
|Bibi Zhou/WOW
|Mainland Most Popular Female Singer(Chinese:内地观众最爱女歌手)
|
|rowspan="3" style="text-align:center;"|
|-
|Bibi Zhou/WOW
|Most Popular Female Singer(Chinese:最受欢迎女歌手)
|
|-
|WOW
|Golden Melody Prize(Chinese:金曲奖)
|
|-
!scope="row" rowspan="2"|2009
|Your Love(Chinese:你们的爱)
|Golden Melody Prize(Chinese:金曲奖)
|
|
|-
|Bibi Zhou
|Mainland Most Popular Female Singer(Chinese:内地观众最爱女歌手)
|
|

V Chart Awards 

!
|-
!scope="row" rowspan="2"|2014
|Unlock
|Album of the Year(Chinese:年度专辑)
|
|
|-
|Bibi Zhou
|Best Female Artist(Mainland China)(Chinese:内地观众最爱女歌手)
|
|

Young Choice Awards 
Young Choice Awards(Chinese:青春的选择年度盛典)is an awards ceremony to honour people based on people's choice on internet.

!
|-
|2013
|Bibi Zhou
|Favorite Female Artist(Chinese:最受欢迎女歌手)
|
|
|}

References 

Chinese music-related lists